Provogue Personal Care Mr India 2015 was the seventh edition of Mr India World contest held in Mumbai on July 23, 2015. Fifteen contestants from all over the country were shortlisted to compete in the main event held in Mumbai. Previous year's winner, Mr India 2014 and Mister World 2014 finalist, Prateik Jain passed on his title to Rohit Khandelwal of Hyderabad, Telangana. Rahul Rajasekharan from Kerala was declared the 1st Runner Up and Prateek Gujral from Maharashtra was declared the 2nd Runner Up at the grand finale held in Club Royalty, Mumbai.

Rohit Khandelwal had represented India at the Mister World contest and went on to win the title of Mister World 2016 creating history to become the first Asian ever to win the title.

Jitesh Thakur represented India at the first inception of Mr Supranational. Wherein he won the 2nd runner up position. He also bagged the sub title Top Model at the said Pageant.

Results 
Color key

Special Awards

Contestants
 15 contestants from all over India were shortlisted to compete in the main event in Mumbai.

References

External links
 Mr India Official Website

India
Beauty pageants in India
Mister World
2015 beauty pageants in India